There are many Dutch Reformed Churches, and many are called Reformed Dutch Church. These include:

Belleville Dutch Reformed Church or Reformed Dutch Church of Second River
Bloomingburg Reformed Protestant Dutch Church
Dutch Reformed Church (Newburgh, New York)
Dutch Reformed Church at Romopock
Dutch Reformed Church in the English Neighborhood
Dutch Reformed Church of Gansevoort
Fairfield Dutch Reformed Church
First Reformed Dutch Church of Bergen Neck or the First Federated Church of Bayonne
First Reformed Dutch Church, Hackensack or the Old Church on the Green
First Reformed Dutch Church, Somerville
Flatbush Reformed Dutch Church Complex
Helderberg Reformed Dutch Church
High Bridge Reformed Church
Holmdel Dutch Reformed Church
Hyde Park Reformed Dutch Church
Leeds Dutch Reformed Church
New Hurley Reformed Church or Reformed Dutch Church of New Hurley
New North Reformed Low Dutch Church
North Reformed Church
Old Bergen Church
Old Dutch Church (Kingston, New York) or the First Reformed Protestant Dutch Church of Kingston
Old Dutch Church of Sleepy Hollow or the Dutch Reformed Church (Sleepy Hollow)
Prattsville Reformed Dutch Church
Reformed Church of Beacon or the Reformed Dutch Church of Fishkill Landing
Reformed Dutch Church of Blawenburg
Reformed Dutch Church of Claverack
Reformed Dutch Church (Kinderhook, New York)
Reformed Dutch Church of Poughkeepsie
Reformed Dutch Church of Rensselaer in Watervliet
Reformed Dutch Church of Stone Arabia or the Stone Arabia Reformed Church
Reformed Dutch Church of Wyckoff
Reformed Protestant Dutch Church of Klyne Esopus or the Klyne Esopus Historical Society Museum
Schraalenburgh North Church
Second Reformed Dutch Church of Kingston
Second Reformed Dutch Church
South Bushwick Reformed Protestant Dutch Church Complex
South Schraalenburgh Church
St. Nicholas Collegiate Reformed Protestant Dutch Church